Çamköy (literally "pine village" in Turkish) may refer to the following places in Turkey:

 Çamköy, Ayvacık
 Çamköy, Bekilli
 Çamköy, Bigadiç, a village
 Çamköy, Buldan
 Çamköy, Çamlıdere, a village in the district of Çamlıdere, Ankara Province
 Çamköy, Çan
 Çamköy, Dursunbey, a village
 Çamköy, Ezine
 Çamköy, Germencik, a village in the district of Germencik, Aydın Province
 Çamköy, Gölhisar
 Çamköy, Karacasu, a village in the district of Karacasu, Aydın Province
 Çamköy Dam